The American Party was a political party in Utah from 1904 to 1911. It was designed to counter the influence of the Church of Jesus Christ of Latter-day Saints (LDS Church) in Utah politics and is often described as an anti-Mormon party.

Creation
The American Party was founded in 1904 by supporters of Thomas Kearns. Kearns was a U.S. Senator from Utah, mining and railroad magnate, banker and newspaper owner, including the owner of the Salt Lake Tribune; under his ownership, the Tribune became a harsh critic of the LDS Church. In 1904, Utah's junior senator, LDS Church Apostle Reed Smoot, convinced the state legislature to elect George Sutherland to replace Kearns. Kearns was outraged and was convinced that Smoot had orchestrated his removal because of the Tribune'''s opposition to the LDS Church. Kearns's supporters formed the American Party, which was an attempt to revive Utah's 19th-century anti-Mormon Liberal Party. Though not publicly among the party's organizers, Kearns was influential in the party. As an editor for the Salt Lake Tribune, former United States Senator Frank J. Cannon also played an important promotional role for the party.

Activities
The party attracted a variety of non-Mormon, lapsed Mormon, and ex-Republican politicians and was endorsed by the Salt Lake Tribune''. Between 1905 and 1911, the party controlled the municipal governments of Ogden and Salt Lake City. In 1905, party co-founder Ezra Thompson was elected mayor of Salt Lake City, with fellow party members W. Mont Ferry, Arthur J. Davis, Lewis D. Martin, and Martin E. Mulvey elected as city councilors. (Thompson had previously served as a Republican mayor of Salt Lake City from 1900 to 1903.) Thompson resigned in 1907 and he was replaced by new party leader John S. Bransford, who was re-elected in 1907 and was mayor until 1911.

In 1908, the American Party ran John A. Street for governor of Utah. Central platforms of the party were that the leaders of the LDS Church were still participating in plural marriage and had no intention of abiding by the 1890 Manifesto. The party also alleged that the LDS Church monopolized lines of business within Utah and that the state needed a more vigorous enforcement of the separation between church and state.

In 1909, the party opposed a state bill that would have instituted Prohibition in Utah. The LDS Church did not formally support the prohibition bill, but many of its top leaders did.

Disbanding
The party, although reasonably successful for ten years, was disbanded after the 1911 elections in which the party performed disappointingly.

See also
Anti-Mormon Party (Illinois)

Notes

Political parties established in 1905
Political parties disestablished in 1911
Politics of Utah
Defunct political parties in the United States
Criticism of Mormonism
Regional and state political parties in Utah
1905 establishments in Utah
1911 disestablishments in Utah
Mormonism and politics